Kakanj culture was an early Neolithic culture that appeared in Central Bosnia and covered periods dated from 6230–5990 to 5300–4900 BC.

History
Central Bosnia and areas in Sarajevo, Visoko, and Zenica basins were some of the main areas of different prehistoric populations, especially along the shores of the Bosna river. Central Bosnia was already populated by other cultures, like the Starčevo and Cardium pottery. These formed the basis for the creation of a unique culture that is known as the Kakanj culture, as the first findings were at a site called Obre, near the town of Kakanj. Maria Gimbutas regarded the Kakanj culture as a local variant of the Starčevo, with elements of the Danilo group.

Other known locations of this culture are sited at: Kakanj – Plandište, Papratnica; Visoko – Arnautovići, Okolište, and Tuk near Zavidovići. The Kakanj culture had strong influence on the development of the Butmir culture.

Settlements and artefacts 
Excavated settlements were not uniform. Site in Obre included rectangular houses with 1 or 2 rooms, foundations made of stone and clay loam walls. Stone tools are predominant, especially molded hatchets. Tools like spatulas and needles were made out of bones.

Pottery is versatile, coarse, and monochrome. The surface of the monochrome ceramics is well polished, as is in Butmir culture. The shapes include vessels with tall hollow conical stems, alongside bowls with thicker rims and 4-foot rhytons. Plastic is poorly represented.

See also 

 Butmir culture
 Early history of Bosnia and Herzegovina

References

External links 

 Neolithic of Middle East and Southeastern Europe (in Bosnian)
 Analysis of prehistoric ceramics at Donja Papratnica and Zagrebnice near Kakanj (in Bosnian)
 Obre  encyclopedia.com
 Pictures of artefacts found at Plandište
 New radiocarbon dates for the Neolithic period in Bosnia & Herzegovina

History of Kakanj
Archaeological cultures of Southeastern Europe
Archaeological cultures in Bosnia and Herzegovina
Neolithic cultures of Europe